I Love You Avenue is the third solo album by English singer-songwriter Nick Heyward. It was released in 1988 through Reprise Records and produced two UK singles, ‘’You’re My World’’ (#67 in the UK Singles Chart) and ‘’Tell Me Why’’.

Recording and production
The album was produced by Heyward's manager, Graham Sacher, and recorded at four studios: Village Recorders in Dagenham, London; Rooster Studios, Mayfair and PRT.

Track listing

Personnel 
Credits are adapted from the album's liner notes.

 Nick Heyward – vocals, electric guitar, acoustic guitar, keyboards, design
 Peter Beckett – keyboards
 Richard Bull – guitar
 Nick Coler – keyboards
 Les Nemes – bass guitar, drum programming
 Jackie Rawe – backing vocals
 Gary Sanctuary – keyboards
 Paul Spong – trumpet
 Phil Smith – saxophone
 Pete Thoms – trombone
 Andy Whitmore – keyboards

Production
 Graham Sacher – record producer
 Richard Bull – engineer
 Ian Richardson – assistant engineer
 Nick Sykes – assistant engineer
 Arun Chkraverty – mastering
 John Hudson mixing
 Simon Halfon – design, photography

References

External links 
 
 

1988 albums
Nick Heyward albums
Reprise Records albums